The Energy and Resources Institute (TERI) is a research institute in New Delhi that specializes in the fields of energy, environment and sustainable development. Established in 1974, it was formerly known as the Tata Energy Research Institute.  As the scope of its activities widened, it was renamed The Energy and Resources Institute in 2003.

History

The origins of TERI lie in Mithapur, a remote town in Gujarat, where a TATA engineer, Darbari Seth, was concerned about the enormous quantities of energy his factory spent on desalination. He proposed the idea of a research institute to tackle the depletion of natural resources and energy scarcity. J. R. D. Tata, chairman of the TATA Group, liked the idea and accepted the proposal. TERI was set up with a modest corpus of 35 million rupees. On the invitation of the then Prime Minister Indira Gandhi, TERI was registered in Delhi in 1974 as the Tata Energy Research Institute.

Locations
TERI initially began its operations in the Bombay House, Mumbai, headquarters of Tata. In 1984, it moved to Delhi where it continued to operate out on the rented premises (which included the India International Centre) for almost a decade. In 1993, the organization set up its permanent base in Darbari Seth Block, named after its founder, in the India Habitat Centre complex located at Lodhi Road, New Delhi. Today TERI has a global presence with many centres in India and abroad.
Headquarters at the India Habitat Center, New Delhi.
Southern Regional Centre, Bangalore
Western Regional Centre, Goa
North - Eastern Regional Centre, Guwahati
Himalayan Centre, Mukteshwar
TERI Mumbai, Navi Mumbai
TERI Japan, Tokyo
TERI North America, Washington, D.C.
TERI Europe, London
TERI South East Asia, Kuala Lumpur, Malaysia

In October 2011, Princess Máxima of the Netherlands opened the European headquarters of TERI in Utrecht.

TERI established a research base in Africa to provide technical assistance as well as to facilitate exchange of knowledge amongst the communities in various African states.

In 2016–17, TERI set up the world's biggest facility for Mycorrhiza production in Gual Pahari, Gurugram, Haryana.

Staff

TERI has over 1250 employees, with research professionals from disciplines pertaining to issues of environment and energy. The institute's present director general is Dr Vibha Dhawan.

Activities
The scope of the organisation's activities includes climate change, energy efficiency, renewable energy, biotechnology, and social transformation.

 World Sustainable Development Summit (WSDS) - An annual summit which facilitates the exchange of knowledge on diverse aspects of global sustainable development.
 LaBL (Lighting a Billion Lives) - An initiative to provide clean lighting access to bottom of the pyramid communities.
 Green Olympiad - Conducted in association with MoEF, it is an international environment examination that is annually organized for middle and high-school students.

Awards
Ranked 20 in the list of top global think tanks according to a survey conducted by Think Tanks and Civil Societies Program (TTCSP) of University of Pennsylvania, Brookings Institution in 2013
Awarded EDF Pulse Award in Paris by the Chairman of EDF Mr Henri Proglio on 30 April 2014, which recognizes ingenious efforts towards providing access to electricity.
TERI's community radio service Kumaon Vani received an award from the Union Ministry of Information and Broadcasting (I&B) at National Community Radio Sammelan held on 21 March 2014.
TERI's film, The 'Flight' and 'Are we ready to dig in?' won awards at the CMS VATAVARAN 2014 on 2 February 2014.
Awarded the Project Management Institute (PMI) Project of Year (2013) award in the NGO category for LaBL project.
Ranked as the topmost global think-tank in 2013 in the field of climate sciences and research by the International Center for Climate Governance (ICCG)

Publications
TERI Press, TERI's publishing arm releases publications out of which some vaguely noteworthy publications are :

TERI Energy Data Directory and Yearbook (TEDDY) : Launched in 1986, it is a compilation of energy and environment data. It is a reference document and a source of information on energy supply sectors (coal and lignite, oil and gas, power, and renewable energy sources) as well as energy-consuming sectors (agriculture, industry, transport, residential, and commercial sectors).
TerraGreen is a monthly magazine dedicated to disseminating information and knowledge on issues of environment, energy, and sustainable development. It brings in-depth stories from across the world on water, climate change, pollution, natural disasters, conservation measures, environment-friendly technologies and products, recent path-breaking developments, and related topics.

GRIHA
Green Rating for Integrated Habitat Assessment (GRIHA) was conceived by TERI and developed with Ministry of New and Renewable Energy, is a national rating system for green buildings in India.

TERI School of Advanced Studies
TERI School of Advanced Studies was established on 19 August 1998, and was recognised by the University Grants Commission (UGC) as a deemed-to-be University in 1999. Set-up as the TERI School of Advanced Studies in 1998, the institution was subsequently renamed TERI University.

TERI Prakriti School
Established in January 2015 with a vision to provide sustainability education and help create environmental awareness among children at an early age. Inaugurated by Union Minister for Environment and Forests Prakash Javadekar, the K–12 school is affiliated to CBSE.

See also
 Rajendra K. Pachauri
 World Sustainable Development Summit (WSDS)
 TERI University
 TERI-Deakin Nanobiotechnology Centre

References

Energy research institutes
Environmental research institutes
Multidisciplinary research institutes
Environmental organisations based in India
Climate change in India
Climate change organizations
Research institutes in Delhi
Tata institutions
Environmental organizations established in 1974
Research institutes established in 1974
1974 establishments in Delhi